Sumarokov is a rural locality (a khutor) in Starooskolsky District, Belgorod Oblast, Russia. The population was 11 as of 2010. There is 1 street.

Geography 
Sumarokov is located 20 km south of Stary Oskol (the district's administrative centre) by road. Novikovo is the nearest rural locality.

References 

Rural localities in Starooskolsky District